Yingying Fan is a Chinese-American statistician and Centennial Chair in Business Administration and Professor in Data Sciences and Operations Department of the Marshall School of Business at the University of Southern California. She also holds joint appointments at the USC Dana and David Dornsife College of Letters, Arts and Sciences, and Keck Medicine of USC. Her contributions to statistics and data science were recognized by the Royal Statistical Society Guy Medal in Bronze in 2017, the Institute of Mathematical Statistics Medallion Lecture in 2023, and the International Congress of Chinese Mathematicians 45-Minute Invited Lecture in 2023. She was elected Fellow of American Statistical Association in 2019 and Fellow of Institute of Mathematical Statistics "for seminal contributions to high-dimensional inference, variable selection, classification, networks, and nonparametric methodology, particularly in the field of financial econometrics, and for conscientious professional service" in 2020.

References

American statisticians
Women statisticians
University of Southern California faculty
Fellows of the American Statistical Association
Fellows of the Institute of Mathematical Statistics
Living people
Year of birth missing (living people)
Place of birth missing (living people)